Semashko is an East Slavic surname originated  from a diminutive for the given name Semyon (Simeon). The Belarusian-language spelling is Syamashka. 

Spelled in Polish as Siemaszko, it was a surname of nobility in Poland (Siemaszko of Łabędź coat of arms, officially recorded in Volyn Governorate)

Notable people with the surname include:

Dominik Semashko (1878-1932), Belarusian activist 
 Nikolai Semashko (medicine)
 Nikolai Semashko (basketball)
 Yosyf Semashko (1798-1868), bishop in the Uniate and Orthodox churches

See also

Semaška
Simashko

References